Bathythrix triangularis is a species of ichneumon wasp in the family Ichneumonidae. It is found in North America.

References

Parasitic wasps
Articles created by Qbugbot
Insects described in 1868